Eduardo Jesus Lopez-Reyes (Ed Lopez-Reyes, Eduardo Lopez, Ed Lopez), of Greenwich, Connecticut, is an American Republican Party activist and former National Vice Chairman of the Republican Liberty Caucus. A member of Young Conservatives for the Freedom to Marry, he has supported same-sex marriage. He participated in a national tour to advocate for third-party presence in national presidential debates. He is a former resident and was active in politics and community programs in Rhode Island and New Hampshire.

Military service and education
He graduated from Fairview High School in Boulder, Colorado. Before completing his studies at the University of Rhode Island he served as a Mormon missionary in the Dominican Republic for two years. He was a graduate student of the School of Government and International Affairs at Durham University, in the United Kingdom. He was the managing editor of the online GAIA Review. He graduated with a master's degree in International Relations Middle East and Arabic language studies.

While in the United Kingdom, Lopez served in the United States Army Reserve Military Intelligence Corps. He was also a sergeant in the Connecticut Army National Guard.

Concurrently, he began PhD work, returning to Durham University. He augmented his Arabic language studies at American University in Cairo's Arabic Language Institute, in Cairo, Egypt. Lopez was a member of Ustinov College at Durham.

Career

Early career
He was the founder and state chairman of the Republican Hispanic Assembly of Rhode Island by late 1997. Lopez was a candidate for Rhode Island Secretary of State against incumbent  James Langevin in the 1998 election cycle. Lopez was a Staff Assistant to United States Senators Hank Brown in Washington, D.C. and for John H. Chafee in his Providence, Rhode Island district office.

Republican Party 
Lopez served as National Vice Chairman of the Republican Liberty Caucus from 2011 through 2015. Lopez served on Rockingham County Leadership Team for former Utah Governor Jon Huntsman, Jr. for President in the 2012 Republican presidential primaries.

Freedom to Marry
In March 2013, Lopez joined Young Conservatives for the Freedom to Marry along with S. E. Cupp, Abby Huntsman, Elizabeth Huntsman, Mary Anne Huntsman, Meghan McCain and other conservative and Republican activists. In June 2013, Lopez joined the group on a nationwide campaign to change the Republican Party's platform points on the issue; the campaign included visits to New Hampshire, Iowa, South Carolina, and Nevada. He was among a group of Republican leaders who expressed their support of same-sex married by filing an amicus brief at the Supreme Court. The brief was organized by former Republican National Committee Chairman Ken Mehlman. Others involved in filing the amicus brief included Senators Mark Kirk and Susan Collins; Former Governor Jon Huntsman of Utah and Governor Charlie Baker of Massachusetts; David Koch; former New York City Mayor Rudy Giuliani; and retired General Stanley McChrystal. On June 26, 2015, the United States Supreme Court decision in Obergefell v. Hodges meant that the Freedom to Marry's movement could be brought to a close.

2016 presidential election
Lopez, a member of the Republican Liberty Caucus, participated in a national tour sponsored by Our America Initiative to advocate for libertarian party participation in national presidential debates. The 40-state tour included speakers such as Governors Gary Johnson and Bill Weld, Free the People's Matt Kibbe, political and communications consultant Liz Mair, Reason Foundation’s David Nott, Foundation for Economic Education’s Jeffrey Tucker, Libertarian Party's Carla Howell and Lopez.

National popular vote
Lopez is an advocate of the National Popular Vote Interstate Compact, as he discussed on an interview on PBS' The Open Mind. In 2020, Lopez became part of the board of advisory board for Libertarians for National Popular Vote, along with former New Mexico Governor Gary Johnson and former Rhode Island Governor Lincoln Chafee; the efforts seek to coalesce libertarian-leaning voters in support of the compact.

Personal life
Lopez was born in Puerto Rico, as was his mother. His father was from Guatemala. Lopez resides in Greenwich, Connecticut. He and his wife, Marie Anne, have been active in political and non-profit efforts together. He presided over a local affiliate of Habitat for Humanity International in New Hampshire between 2009 and 2011. He is a member of the Church of Jesus Christ of Latter-day Saints (LDS Church).

Notes

References

Further reading

External links
Ed Lopez committee website

1974 births
Living people
20th-century Mormon missionaries
American people of Guatemalan descent
American politicians of Guatemalan descent
American politicians of Puerto Rican descent
American LGBT rights activists
American expatriates in Egypt
American expatriates in the United Kingdom
American Mormon missionaries in the Dominican Republic
American libertarians
Connecticut National Guard personnel
Hispanic and Latino American politicians
Latter Day Saints from Connecticut
Latter Day Saints from New Hampshire
Latter Day Saints from Rhode Island
New Hampshire Republicans
Rhode Island Republicans
People from San Juan, Puerto Rico
People from Greenwich, Connecticut
Alumni of Ustinov College, Durham
University of Rhode Island alumni
The American University in Cairo alumni
United States Army non-commissioned officers
United States Army reservists